Amber Leone Neben (born February 18, 1975) is an American racing cyclist, who most recently rode for UCI Women's Continental Team . Neben won the UCI world time trial championship in 2008 and 2016 as well as the U.S. national road race championship in 2003 and 2017.

Career

Early life
At the age of four Neben survived a bout of spinal meningitis, which left her in a coma for three days. Doctors told her parents that she was unlikely to survive, and that if she did, she would probably have endured brain damage and have lost her hearing. Neben played soccer and ran cross-country in junior high and high school. She attended the University of Nebraska on a track and cross-country scholarship. Stress fractures stopped her running and she became an undergraduate assistant coach in distance running. She took up cycling after graduating from college with a Bachelor of Science degree in biology. She then obtained a master's degree in biology from the University of California, Irvine, having originally commenced studies for a PhD. Whilst she was at UC Irvine she scored a top 10 finish at the national collegiate cycling championships, which persuaded her to exit with her master's degree and focus on professional cycling.

Professional career
She concentrated first on mountain biking but her greatest success was on the road. She won the Rupert to Pomerelle stage of the 2001 Women's Challenge race with its long, steep climb to the finish, the fourth American to win a stage at the Women's Challenge since it became a UCI event. She then concentrated on road cycling and was picked for the road world championship team in 2001 and 2002.

Neben raced again in 2004. She missed placing first by eight seconds in the time trial selection race for the Olympic Games. In spring 2005, she won the Tour de l'Aude in France. She won again in 2006. She was picked for the 2008 U.S. Olympic team and came 33rd in the road race event in Beijing. Later in 2008 she became the World TT Champion.

Neben made the 2012 U.S. Olympic team for the Women's road race, along with Kristin Armstrong, Shelley Olds and Evelyn Stevens. In the Women's time trial she finished 7th.

Doping suspension
Neben tested positive for the banned substance 19-Norandrosterone on May 31, 2003, after she won the Coupe du Monde Montreal World Cup race. The test results were not confirmed until after her "A" sample and "B" sample both returned 6.9 ng/ml, which is above the 5 ng/ml cutoff. Neben appealed to the Court of Arbitration for Sport [CAS] and accepted a provisional suspension from mid-July 2003. Neben said the positive test came from contaminated supplements. As she was a member of the T-Mobile Women's Cycling Team, a trade team owned by USA Cycling, she enlisted USA Cycling top management as witnesses in her defense.  Sean Petty, VP of Marketing of USA Cycling, Gerard Bisceglia, CEO for USA Cycling, Steve Johnson, COO and Director of Athletics for USA Cycling, Bob Stapleton, Vice Chair for T-Mobile USA all testified on her behalf.  The North American CAS ruled in October 2003 that doping had occurred but that it was not intentional. Neben was suspended, in a split decision, for six months, starting from the provisional ban beginning on July 13, 2003.  The ruling also stated that all competitive results which occurred on or after May 31, 2003 were cancelled. Therefore, her win at the Coupe du Monde Montreal on May 31 was cancelled, but not her Elite Women's Road Race National Title, which occurred on May 22.   She would have to be tested for drugs regularly for the following 18 months.

Personal life
She is married to Jason, an assistant professor of education at Concordia University Irvine. In 2007, she underwent a successful program of treatment for melanoma.

Major results

2001
 1st Time trial, California State Road Championships
 1st Overall Cascade Cycling Classic
1st Stages 1, 2 & 3
 1st Stage 1 GP Féminin International du Canada
 2nd Road race, National Road Championships
 5th Overall Women's Challenge
1st Stage 1
 10th Overall Redlands Bicycle Classic
2002
 1st Overall Gracia–Orlová
1st Mountains classification
1st Stage 3
 National Road Championships
2nd Road race
2nd Time trial
 2nd Housatonic Valley Classic
 6th Overall Women's Challenge
 9th Overall Grande Boucle Féminine Internationale
 10th Coupe du Monde Cycliste Féminine de Montréal
2003
 National Road Championships
1st  Road race
3rd Time trial
 
 4th Overall Redlands Bicycle Classic
 4th Overall Sea Otter Classic
 4th Overall Gracia–Orlová
1st Stage 2 (ITT)
 7th La Flèche Wallonne Féminine
 7th Tour de Berne
2004
 1st Overall Tour of the Gila
1st Stages 1 & 2
 2nd Time trial, National Road Championships
 5th Coupe du Monde Cycliste Féminine de Montréal
 7th Overall Giro della Toscana
1st Stage 2
 9th Overall Tour du Grand Montréal
2005
 1st Overall Tour de l'Aude
1st Stage 3
 2nd Time trial, National Road Championships
 4th Overall Giro d'Italia Femminile
 5th Time trial, UCI Road World Championships
 9th La Flèche Wallonne Féminine
2006
 1st  Time trial, Pan American Road Championships
 1st Overall Tour de l'Aude Cycliste Féminin
 1st Overall Redlands Bicycle Classic
1st Stages 1 (ITT) & 2
 National Road Championships
2nd Time trial
3rd Road race
 2nd Overall Thüringen Rundfahrt der Frauen
 2nd Overall Gracia–Orlová
 2nd La Route de France
 2nd L'Heure D'Or Feminin
 5th La Flèche Wallonne Féminine
 10th Time trial, UCI Road World Championships
2007
 1st Overall Redlands Bicycle Classic
1st Stage 2 (ITT)
 1st Overall La Route de France
1st Stage 1 (ITT)
 National Road Championships
2nd Time trial
3rd Road race
 2nd Overall Thüringen Rundfahrt der Frauen
 2nd Chrono Champenois – Trophée Européen
 3rd Overall Giro di San Marino
 4th Time trial, UCI Road World Championships
 4th La Flèche Wallonne Féminine
 5th Overall Tour de l'Aude Cycliste Féminin
 9th Coupe du Monde Cycliste Féminine de Montréal
2008
 1st  Time trial, UCI Road World Championships
 1st Overall Tour Cycliste Féminin International de l'Ardèche
 2nd Overall Giro d'Italia Femminile
 3rd Grand Prix de Suisse
 3rd Chrono Champenois – Trophée Européen
 5th Overall Iurreta-Emakumeen Bira
 5th La Flèche Wallonne Féminine
 5th Memorial Davide Fardelli
 5th Chrono des Nations
 8th Overall Tour de l'Aude Cycliste Féminin
2009
 1st Stage 2 (ITT) Giro d'Italia Femminile
 2nd Overall Redlands Bicycle Classic
 2nd Memorial Davide Fardelli
 4th Overall Gracia–Orlová
1st Stage 3 (ITT)
 4th La Flèche Wallonne Féminine
 5th Overall Tour Cycliste Féminin International de l'Ardèche
 6th Time trial, UCI Road World Championships
 6th Overall Tour de l'Aude Cycliste Féminin
1st Stage 2 (TTT)
 9th Liberty Classic
 10th Coupe du Monde Cycliste Féminine de Montréal
2010
 1st Memorial Davide Fardelli
 2nd Time trial, National Road Championships
 2nd Overall Women's Tour of New Zealand
1st Stage 4 (ITT)
 2nd Chrono des Nations
 4th Time trial, UCI Road World Championships
 4th Overall Redlands Bicycle Classic
1st Prologue
 6th Chrono Champenois
 7th Chrono Gatineau
2011
 1st GP Stad Roeselare
 1st Chrono des Nations
 1st Open de Suède Vårgårda TTT
 2nd Time trial, National Road Championships
 2nd Overall Thüringen Rundfahrt der Frauen
 2nd Chrono Champenois
 3rd  Time trial, Pan American Road Championships
 3rd Chrono Gatineau
 3rd Memorial Davide Fardelli
 8th Time trial, UCI Road World Championships
2012
 UCI Road World Championships
1st  Team time trial (with Ellen van Dijk, Charlotte Becker, Evelyn Stevens, Ina-Yoko Teutenberg and Trixi Worrack)
4th Road race
7th Time trial
 1st  Time trial, Pan American Road Championships
 1st  Time trial, National Road Championships
 1st Open de Suède Vårgårda TTT
 1st Chrono des Nations
 1st Stage 2 (TTT) Holland Ladies Tour
 3rd Grand Prix el Salvador
 3rd Chrono Gatineau
 4th Overall Vuelta a El Salvador
1st Points classification
1st Mountains classification
1st Stages 2 & 3b (ITT)
 6th Overall Grand Prix Elsy Jacobs
 7th Time trial, Summer Olympics
2013
 6th Grand Prix de Oriente
 6th Chrono des Nations
 8th La Flèche Wallonne Féminine
2014
 2nd Overall Cascade Cycling Classic
2015
 1st  Overall San Dimas Stage Race
1st Stage 1 (ITT)
 2nd Overall La Route de France
 2nd Overall Redlands Bicycle Classic
 2nd Winston-Salem Cycling Classic
 3rd Time trial, National Road Championships
 3rd Overall Joe Martin Stage Race
 3rd Overall Cascade Cycling Classic
 3rd Giro dell'Emilia Internazionale Donne Elite
 4th Tour of California Women's Time Trial
 4th Chrono Champenois
 4th Chrono des Nations
 7th Chrono Gatineau
2016
 1st  Time trial, UCI Road World Championships
 1st Overall La Route de France
1st Stages 4 (ITT) & 5
 1st Chrono Gatineau
 2nd Time trial, National Road Championships
 4th Chrono Champenois
2017
 National Road Championships
1st  Road race
1st  Time trial
 3rd Chrono Gatineau
2018
 1st  Time trial, Pan American Road Championships
 1st  Time trial, National Road Championships
 1st Chrono Gatineau
 1st Chrono Kristin Armstrong
 7th Time trial, UCI Road World Championships
2019
 1st  Time trial, National Road Championships
 1st Chrono Gatineau
 2nd  Time trial, Pan American Road Championships
 4th Time trial, UCI Road World Championships
2020
 6th Time trial, UCI Road World Championships
2021
 2nd Time trial, National Road Championships
 4th Time trial, UCI Road World Championships
 5th Time trial, Summer Olympics

See also
 List of doping cases in cycling

References

External links

Amber Neben's team 
CAS arbitration ruling in Amber Neben case (pdf file)
Daily Peloton interview
 

1975 births
Living people
American female cyclists
Cyclists at the 2008 Summer Olympics
Olympic cyclists of the United States
University of Nebraska–Lincoln alumni
University of California, Irvine alumni
UCI Road World Champions (women)
Cyclists at the 2012 Summer Olympics
People from Irvine, California
Sportspeople from California
Doping cases in cycling
American sportspeople in doping cases
Cyclists at the 2020 Summer Olympics
21st-century American women
Cyclists from California